Lewinella agarilytica  is a Gram-negative and aerobic bacterium from the genus of Lewinella which has been isolated from beach sediments on Jeju Island in Korea.

References

External links
Type strain of Lewinella agarilytica at BacDive -  the Bacterial Diversity Metadatabase	

Bacteroidota
Bacteria described in 2007